Debra Thana Sahid Kshudiram Smriti Mahavidyalaya, also known as Debra College,  is an undergraduate, coeducational college situated in Gangaram Chak, Debra, Paschim Medinipur, West Bengal. It was established in the year 2006. The college is under Vidyasagar University.

Departments

Bengali
English
Sanskrit
History
Education
Philosophy
Computer Science
BCA
BMLT
Geography
Physics
Math
Chemistry

See also

References

External links
Debra Thana Sahid Kshudiram Smriti Mahavidyalaya
Vidyasagar University
University Grants Commission
National Assessment and Accreditation Council

Universities and colleges in Paschim Medinipur district
Colleges affiliated to Vidyasagar University
Educational institutions established in 2006
2006 establishments in West Bengal